Japantown, Little Tokyo or  is an old neighbourhood in Vancouver, British Columbia, Canada, located east of Gastown and north of Chinatown, that once had a concentration of Japanese immigrants.

Japantown ceased to be a distinct Japanese ethnic area during World War II when Japanese Canadians had their property confiscated and were interned. Although some Japanese returned after the war, the community never revived to its original state as the properties of Japanese Canadians were permanently forfeited by the Canadian government. As Japantown ceased to exist, the area is often referred to and marketed as Railtown by real estate developers.

History
Japantown was attacked on 7 September 1907 by the Asiatic Exclusion League, which smashed many windows in parts of Chinatown, and then moved on to Japantown. Four waves of attacks ensued, with the rioters being repulsed by the armed Japanese residents who had received warning of the attacks in Chinatown. In spite of inflicting a number of injuries upon the mob, more than 50 stores and businesses on Powell Street had their windows broken resulting in thousands of dollars of damage. The centenary of the attacks were marked by a Riot Walk through Chinatown and Japantown on 7 September 2007.

In the days prior to World War II, in addition to having many restaurants, hotels and businesses, the Japanese district had three Japanese daily papers (Tiriku Nippo, Canada Shimbun, and Minshu), three Buddhist churches, several sentō (Chitose, Tokiwa, Kotobuki, and Matsunoyu), and its language school supported as many as one thousand students.

During World War II, Japanese Canadians had their property confiscated and were sent to internment camps and prisoner of war camps and Japantown ceased to be a distinct Japanese ethnic area. Although some Japanese returned to the area after the war, the community never revived as the properties confiscated by the Canadian government were never returned. The area is now part of Strathcona in the Downtown Eastside and the area is informally known as Railtown.

Along Powell Street, a few remnants of the former Japanese neighbourhood still exist. The Vancouver Buddhist Church, formerly the Japanese Methodist Church, still exists at 220 Jackson Avenue at Powell, as does the Vancouver Japanese Language School and Japanese Hall at 475 and 487 Alexander Street at Jackson, which is the only property in Canada that was ever returned to Japanese Canadians after World War II. Until the boom in Japanese restaurants in the 1980s, two restaurants on Powell Street were among the only Japanese dining establishments in the city.

Oppenheimer Park
Oppenheimer Park (Powell Street Grounds) in this area was the home for Asahi baseball team and it is the site for the annual two-day Powell Street Festival, which began in 1977. It is held every August, in the first weekend of the month, and is a community celebration of Japanese heritage as well as the alternative and street culture of the Downtown Eastside.

Little Ginza

An upscale enclave of ethnic Japanese retailers and restaurants known as Little Ginza - has developed on Alberni Street near Burrard Street in the slim boundary area between the West End and the Financial District in Downtown Vancouver.

The new enclave has been gaining momentum over the course of the last forty years with an increasing number of high-end restaurants, dance clubs, karaoke bars, shops, and upscale boutiques. These venues are largely geared to the usual tourists that frequent the city as well as Japanese visitors in search of "bargain"-priced designer goods (relative to prices in Tokyo or Osaka), and for omiyage (obligatory gifts to be given on return to Japan).

See also
Asahi (baseball team)
Judo in British Columbia
Judo in Canada

Notes

External links
Japanese Canadian Timeline from arrival of first Japanese person in 1877 (Japanese Canadian National Museum).
History of Vancouver Japanese Language School and Japanese Hall, established 1906.
History of Vancouver Buddhist Church, established 1906.
100th Anniversary of Anti-Asian Riots, 7 September 1907 (2007 Anniversaries of Change).
2007 Riot Walk map guide: First and second (last) page (2007 Anniversaries of Change).
Powell Street Festival, established 1977 (Powell Street Festival Society).
Japantown and Powell Street  (Virtual Vancouver).

Asian-Canadian culture in Vancouver
Ethnic enclaves in British Columbia
Japanese-Canadian culture
Vancouver
Neighbourhoods in Vancouver